Kristian F. Javier Samuel (born 6 April 1996) is a British Virgin Islander footballer who plays for the British Virgin Islands national team.

Early life
Javier was born in Charlotte Amalie, U.S. Virgin Islands and raised in Atlanta, Georgia, United States to a Dominican Republic father and a British Virgin Islander mother.

College and club career
Javier played soccer for Brussels at the DODDS (Department of Defense Dependents Schools) European Championships, where he was named boys' soccer athlete of the year. He then moved back to America to play soccer at the LaGrange College for two seasons before leaving for Premier Development League side Peachtree City MOBA, where he played one game in the 2016 season.

International career
Javier made his senior international debut in a 3–0 away loss to Martinique in qualification for the 2017 Caribbean Cup.

Career statistics

Club

Notes

International

References

External links
 Kristian Javier at CaribbeanFootballDatabase
 Kristian Javier at TopDrawerSoccer

1996 births
Living people
People from Saint Thomas, U.S. Virgin Islands
Citizens of the United Kingdom through descent
American soccer players
British Virgin Islands footballers
Association football midfielders
Peachtree City MOBA players
Lionsbridge FC players
USL League Two players
United States men's youth international soccer players
British Virgin Islands international footballers
African-American soccer players
American sportspeople of Dominican Republic descent
American people of British Virgin Islands descent
Black British sportspeople
British people of Dominican Republic descent
LaGrange Panthers men's soccer players
21st-century African-American sportspeople